The OFC Futsal Championship is the main national futsal competition of the Oceania Football Confederation (OFC) nations. It was first held in 1992.

The competition was initially held every four years. From 2008 onwards, however, it became an annual tournament.

Australia won every edition of the competition until it left the Oceania Football Confederation in 2006. Solomon Islands have won the three editions of the tournament which have taken place since then - including a decisive 8-1 victory over Fiji in the final of the 2009 edition. It is a qualification for the FIFA Futsal World Cup.

The original name was the OFC Futsal Championship, from 2019, the tournament will be known as the OFC Futsal Nations Cup.

Summaries

Performance by nations

* = hosts

Medal summary

All-time table
As of 2019 OFC Futsal Nations Cup. Source:

Participating nations
Legend
1st — Champions
2nd — Runners-up
3rd — Third place
4th — Fourth place
SF — Semifinals
5th-8th — Fifth to Eighth place
QF — Quarterfinals
GS — Group stage
R2 — Round 2
R1 — Round 1
q — Qualified for upcoming tournament
 •  — Did not qualify
  ×   – Did not enter
  ×   – Withdrew / Banned / Entry not accepted by FIFA
     – To be determined
   — Hosts

FIFA Futsal World Cup Qualifiers
Legend
1st – Champions
2nd – Runners-up
3rd – Third place
4th – Fourth place
QF – Quarterfinals
R2 – Round 2 (1989–2008, second group stage, top 8; 2012–present: knockout round of 16)
R1 – Round 1
     – Hosts

Q – Qualified for upcoming tournament

See also
OFC Futsal Champions League

References

External links
OFC Official Website

 
International futsal competitions
1992 establishments in Oceania
Recurring sporting events established in 1992